Slave Ship is a 1937 film directed by Tay Garnett and starring Warner Baxter and Wallace Beery. The supporting cast features Mickey Rooney, George Sanders, Jane Darwell, and Joseph Schildkraut. It is one of very few films out of the forty-eight that Beery made during the sound era for which he did not receive top billing.

Plot

Cast

Reception
Writing for Night and Day in 1937, Graham Greene gave the film a mixed review, finding fault with the "slow-motion emotions" of Warner Baxter's acting and the plot's "slowness and inevitability" whereas real life is replete with "unexpected encounter[s]". Nevertheless, Greene opined that "[Slave-Ship] isn't a bad film, [and] it has excellent moments". Chief amongst these moments, Greene praised the knife-throwing scenes and the general acting of Wallace Beery.

References

External links
 
 
 
 

1937 films
1937 adventure films
1930s historical films
1937 drama films
American historical films
American adventure drama films
1930s English-language films
Films based on American novels
Films directed by Tay Garnett
20th Century Fox films
Films set in the 1850s
Films set in the 1860s
Seafaring films
Films about slavery
Films produced by Darryl F. Zanuck
Films with screenplays by Lamar Trotti
American black-and-white films
1930s American films